Tiger Triumph is the bilateral tri-service amphibious military exercise involving the armed forces of India and the United States. It is the first tri-service military exercise between the two countries. India has previously only held tri-service exercises with Russia.

India and the United States signed a defence agreement on 6 September 2018 committing to holding a joint land, air and sea exercise in India in 2019. The final planning conference for Tiger Triumph was held at the Eastern Naval Command headquarters in Visakhapatnam, Andhra Pradesh on September 16–20, 2019 and was attended by delegates from the United States Navy and the United States Marine Corps and representatives from the Indian Army, Navy and Air Force. The two sides also visited the proposed campsite in Kakinada, Andhra Pradesh and conducted a table-top exercise as preparation. Tiger Triumph was publicly announced by U.S. President Donald Trump during his address at the Howdy Modi community event in honour of Prime Minister Narendra Modi at the NRG Stadium in Houston, Texas on 22 September 2019.

The Indian Navy's Eastern Fleet commander served as the overall force commander for Tiger Triumph, with a U.S. Marine Corps officer attached with him. A total of 1,200 Indian and 500 U.S. military personnel participated in the nine-day exercise. The American side was led by the United States Marine Corps Forces, Pacific. Marines and sailors traveled from Okinawa, Japan to Vishakhapatnam arriving on board the USS Germantown (LSD-42) on 13 November 2019. The Indian Navy was represented by  amphibious transport dock INS Jalashwa (L41), amphibious warfare vessel INS Airavat (L24), and survey ship INS Sandhayak. Indian Army troops from the 19 Madras and 7 Guards, Indian Air Force Mil Mi-17 helicopters and Rapid Action Medical Team (IAF-RAMT) also participated in the exercise. The United States sent the USS Germantown and troops from the 3rd Marine Division. The opening ceremony of Tiger Triumph was held aboard the INS Jalashwa on 14 November, as well as a joint flag parade and media interaction, followed by a reception aboard the USS Germantown.

The exercise was held in two phases. The harbour phase was held in Visakhapatnam on November 13–16 and included training visits, subject matter expert exchanges, sports events and social interactions. Both forces then sailed southward to Kakinada where the second phase was held on November 17–21. The exercise primarily focused on humanitarian disaster and relief (HADR) operations with aiming to imitate disasters occurring in areas where security was problematic. The two forces brought supplies on shore, established a field hospital, formed patrols to locate actors playing displaced civilians and carried out evacuation by helicopter. The exercise included live fire drills, search-and-seizure training, ship manoeuvres and landings by Indian helicopters on the Germantown's flight deck.

References

Military exercises and wargames
India–United States military relations
November 2019 events in India